Gloria Jeanne Black (October 25, 1937 – October 23, 2014) was an American country music singer.

Life and career
Gloria Jeanne Black was born on October 25, 1937, in Pomona, California.

She first gained wide exposure singing on Cliffie Stone's television program Hometown Jamboree, from 1956 to 1959. Following this, she sang in Nevada, on the Las Vegas Strip and in Tahoe. She signed with Capitol Records in 1960 and released the single "He'll Have to Stay" later that year. The song, which was an answer record to Jim Reeves's hit "He'll Have to Go", was a hit in the US. The song peaked at No. 11 on the R&B Singles chart, No. 6 on the Country chart, and No. 4 on the Billboard Hot 100 chart. The song reached No. 41 in the UK Singles Chart and sold over one million copies globally, earning gold disc status. Black was unable to repeat the success of the single, and is sometimes regarded as a "one-hit wonder."

Personal life
Black was the sister of country music singer Janie Black.

Black was married to actor and director Mark Shipley.  Together they had six children; Eric, Laurel, Angela, Jared, Josh and Tannie Shipley.

After her marriage to Shipley, Black married guitarist and songwriter Billy Strange. She died on October 23, 2014, two days before her 77th birthday.

Discography

Albums

Singles

See also
List of 1960s one-hit wonders in the United States
List of Capitol Records artists

References

1937 births
2014 deaths
Singer-songwriters from California
American women country singers
American country singer-songwriters
People from Pomona, California
Country musicians from California
Country musicians from Utah
21st-century American women
Singer-songwriters from Utah